Appeldoorn Farm is a historic home and farm and national historic district located at Accord, Ulster County, New York. The farmstead was established in 1722, and restored and redeveloped as a Colonial Revival country retreat in 1930–1937. It includes a 1 1/2-story, Dutch Colonial period stone house built about 1758, and expanded in the 19th century and restored in 1930. It has a side gable roof and interior gable end chimneys. Also on the property are the contributing barn (c. 1905), poultry house, farm worker cottage (c. 1905), garage and workhouse (1937), game house (1937), 1 1/2-story tenant house (c. 1851), gate posts (1937), Henry DeWitt cellar hole, and an airport (1937).

It was listed on the National Register of Historic Places in 2013.

References

Historic districts on the National Register of Historic Places in New York (state)
Farms on the National Register of Historic Places in New York (state)
1722 establishments in the Province of New York
Houses completed in 1758
Colonial Revival architecture in New York (state)
Houses in Ulster County, New York
National Register of Historic Places in Ulster County, New York